Dennis Jerome Furlong (July 22, 1945 – March 9, 2018) was a physician and former political figure in New Brunswick, Canada. He represented Dalhousie-Restigouche East in the Legislative Assembly of New Brunswick from 1999 to 2003. He was a member of the Progressive Conservative Party of New Brunswick.

Early life 
He was born in St. John's, Newfoundland and was educated at the University of New Brunswick, the University of Oregon and Memorial University, receiving a M.D. from the latter institution.

Career 
Furlong set up practice in Dalhousie, New Brunswick. From 1985 to 1986, he was president of the College of Physicians and Surgeons of New Brunswick and, from 1988 to 1989, he was president of the New Brunswick Medical Society. He served as Minister of Health and Community Services from 1999 to 2000, Minister of Health and Wellness from 2000 to 2001 and Minister of Education from 2001 to 2003. In November 2005, Furlong took over as head of the inquiry into the use of Agent Orange at CFB Gagetown after the resignation of Vaughn Blaney. He was named as the chair of the New Brunswick Trauma System Advisory Committee in October 2007.

Death 
Furlong died March 9, 2018.

Publications 
Medicare Myths. 50 myths we've endured about the Canadian health care system. 2004.

Notes

References 
 New Brunswick MLAs, New Brunswick Legislative Library (pdf)

1945 births
2018 deaths
Progressive Conservative Party of New Brunswick MLAs
Physicians from New Brunswick
Members of the Executive Council of New Brunswick
People from Restigouche County, New Brunswick
Politicians from St. John's, Newfoundland and Labrador
University of New Brunswick alumni
University of Oregon alumni
Memorial University of Newfoundland alumni
21st-century Canadian politicians